Felix Dudchievicz (c. 1872 - 1932) was a Bessarabian politician.

Biography 

He served as Member of the Sfatul Țării (1917–1918) as the only ethnically Polish one.

Gallery

Bibliography 
Gheorghe E. Cojocaru, Sfatul Țării: itinerar, Civitas, Chişinău, 1998, 
Mihai Taşcă, Sfatul Țării şi actualele autorităţi locale, "Timpul de dimineaţă", no. 114 (849), June 27, 2008 (page 16)

External links 
 Biblio Polis - Vol. 25 (2008) Nr. 1 (Serie nouă)
 Arhiva pentru Sfatul Tarii
 Deputaţii Sfatului Ţării şi Lavrenti Beria

Notes

1872 births
1932 deaths
Moldovan MPs 1917–1918
Politicians from Lublin
Polish expatriates in Moldova
People from Lublin Governorate
Association of the Polish Youth "Zet" members
Moldovan people of Polish descent
Polish prosecutors
Knights of the Order of Polonia Restituta